The Lash is a 1916 American drama silent film directed by James Young and written by George DuBois Proctor and James Young. The film stars Marie Doro, Elliott Dexter, James Neill, Thomas Delmar, Jane Wolfe and Veda McEvers. The film was released October 1, 1916, by Paramount Pictures.

Plot

Cast 
Marie Doro as Sidonie Du Val
Elliott Dexter as Warren Harding
James Neill as John Du Val
Thomas Delmar as Pierre Broule
Jane Wolfe as Henriette Catenat 
Veda McEvers as Violet Wayne
Raymond Hatton as Mr. Crawdon
Josephine Rice as Mrs. Warren Harding

References

External links 
 

1916 films
1910s English-language films
Silent American drama films
1916 drama films
Paramount Pictures films
Films directed by James Young
American black-and-white films
American silent feature films
1910s American films